"Just a Little Girl" is the debut single of English singer-songwriter Amy Studt. Released on 1 July 2002, the single reached a peak of  14 on the UK Singles Chart. It is taken from her debut album, False Smiles, which was released a year later.

Music video
The music video was directed by Sophie Muller. It shows Studt in an old house with crucifixes on the wall, playing a piano while silhouettes of people are dancing on the dancefloor. She then gets up and dances herself when the first chorus kicks in. Then Studt is shown at a beach with a man and she is playing with him. He then looks away and she pushes him over. Finally she appears to be in a glass coffin like that of Snow White, and she falls down into the arms of another Amy, who throws her away and dances until the end of the song.

Track listings
UK enhanced CD single
 "Just a Little Girl"
 "Going out of My Mind"
 "Kick Me"
 "Just a Little Girl" (video)

UK cassette single
 "Just a Little Girl"
 "Going out of My Mind"

Charts

Release history

References

19 Recordings singles
2002 debut singles
2002 songs
Amy Studt songs
Music videos directed by Sophie Muller
Polydor Records singles
Songs written by Amy Studt
Universal Records singles